The Sault Star is a Canadian broadsheet daily newspaper based in Sault Ste. Marie, Ontario. It is owned by Postmedia.

In 2015, the newspaper had a daily paid circulation of 7,577 weekdays and 7,763 on Saturdays. Its total circulation including print and digital was 7,850 on weekdays and 8,469 on Saturdays. Its print circulation is delivered within the Sault Ste. Marie area and Algoma District.

Pre-press facilities are in Barrie with Sault Ste. Marie facilities closed in 2009.

History
The Sault Star was founded by two brothers, John Edward Gardiner (Jack) and James W. Curran who purchased the Sault Courier, which had begun publishing around 1895, from lawyer (and later jurist) Moses McFadden and his brother Uriah in 1901. James Curran had already established a career in the newspaper industry when he arrived in the city in July 1901, having been city editor of the Toronto Empire and news editor of the Montreal Herald.

The Currans published the first edition of The Sault Star, then a weekly, on August 31, 1901 from a small frame building on East Street in the city's downtown using a hand-operated flat-bed printing press that had earlier printed one of Winnipeg's first newspapers. The weekly was published and distributed on Thursdays.

The first edition of the Sault Daily Star was published on March 16, 1912 and sold for two cents a copy with a total circulation of less than 2,000. The new paper promised readers more current news than they might read in Toronto-based papers delivered by rail. Relying on a special wire run and operated by the CPR Telegraph Company, the Currans boasted that "The Sault Daily Star will give the news just one day ahead of the Toronto papers. It will print Monday's news on Monday and deliver the paper to all of Algoma on Monday."

Among the first stories covered by the new daily in 1912 was the news that Sault Ste. Marie would be incorporated as a city later that year.  The newspaper in 1917 reported the use of "trick or treat," ten years earlier than the 1927 example of the phrase that the Oxford English Dictionary reports as its earliest use.

In 1905, James Curran replaced the second-hand equipment with new modern presses of the day and moved the-then The Sault Weekly Star to a two-story building at 374 Queen Street East in the city's downtown. That location was expanded three times to meet larger circulation of the Weekly Star and the daily that followed. In 1951, the much larger staff operation of the Sault Daily Star moved across the street to a new building at 369 Queen Street East which was expanded further in 1958.

Curran remained the paper's publisher and owner until 1941. From that year until 1975 the newspaper was led by his son Robert L. Curran as Publisher, his son John A. Curran as Managing Editor, daughters Nan Rajnovich as Women's Page Editor, and Catharine McAdam, as well as numerous grandchildren.

Family ownership of the Star ended in 1975 when Curran sold the paper to Southam Press Ltd. The new publisher dropped "Daily" from the name that year. Four years later, the paper moved from its Queen Street location to a new 30,000 square foot, $1.4 million facility at 145 Old Garden River Road in the city's north-east.

The Star was acquired by Hollinger International in 1996 and by Osprey Media in 2002. In 2007, both Osprey and the Star were acquired by Sun Media. Postmedia acquired Sun Media and its papers including the Star in 2015.

In May 2014, printing of the Sault Star was moved to the facilities of the North Bay Nugget, resulting in the loss of 23 jobs in the press and mailing room. As a result, print copies of the paper would be produced in 437 km to the east and delivered daily to retailers and subscribers. The press was removed from the Star's headquarters in June 2017.

As part of its strategy to raise capital across its newspaper holdings by divesting of its real estate, in May 2017 Postmedia sold the Sault Star's headquarters at 145 Old Garden River Road to DiTommaso Investments for an undisclosed sum. The Star's 18 employees will continue to operate from a portion of the building. The new owner intends to make improvements to the building and its 5.7 acre property in order to lease space to other commercial or retail tenants beginning in 2018.

Former staff
 E. Paul Wilson, publisher 1988–1992
 Bob Richardson, publisher 1992–1999

See also
 The Evening News – newspaper for Sault Ste. Marie, Michigan
 List of newspapers in Canada

References

External links
 

Mass media in Sault Ste. Marie, Ontario
Postmedia Network publications
Publications with year of establishment missing
1912 establishments in Ontario
Newspapers established in 1912
Daily newspapers published in Ontario